Felipe Turich (December 5, 1898 - March 9, 1992) was a Mexican film and television actor. He appeared in numerous films and TV series throughout the 1930s to the 1980s.

Biography
Turich was born in Hidalgo, Mexico, in 1898. He started his acting career in the 1920s, making his first appearance as an actor in the film, Mademoiselle Midnight in 1924. During the 1950s and 1960s he acted in films like The Capture, Branded, Three Hours to Kill, Giant, The Magnificent Seven and Jesse James Meets Frankenstein's Daughter.

He also appeared in several TV series like Stories of the Century, The Star and the Story, Cavalcade of America, The Restless Gun, and Playhouse 90.

Turich also worked as a comedian in Los Angeles theaters during the 1920s.

Personal life
Turich was married to Rosa Turich and had three children with her.

Death
Turich died on March 9, 1992, in Los Angeles of pneumonia aged 93. He was buried at San Fernando Mission Cemetery and was survived by his wife and three children.

Selected filmography

Film

 Kid Courageous (1935) - Cantina Announcer (uncredited)
 The Kid Ranger (1936) - Cantina Owner (uncredited)
 Danger Patrol (1937) - Mexican officer (uncredited)
 La Inmaculada  (1939)
 Outlaws of the Rio Grande (1941) - Pancho
 The Lone Rider Crosses the Rio (1941) - Lieutenant Mendoza 
 Masquerade in Mexico (1945) - Desk Clerk (uncredited)
 South of Monterey (1946) - Land Owner (uncredited)
 Don Ricardo Returns (1946) - Peon (uncredited)
 Beauty and the Bandit (1946) - Sick Farmer
 Bells of San Fernando (1947) - Pablo, the traitor
 Honeymoon (1947) - Waiter (uncredited)
 Robin Hood of Monterey (1947) - Jose - Sentry / Servant (uncredited)
 To the Victor (1948) - Victor (uncredited)
 Mexican Hayride (1948) - Taxco Silver Dealer (uncredited)
 The Bribe (1949) - First Hotel Clerk (uncredited)
 Son of Billy the Kid (1949) - José Gonzáles
 We Were Strangers (1949) - Spy (uncredited)
 The Big Steal (1949) - Guitar Vendor (uncredited)
 Dakota Lil (1950) - Mexican escort (uncredited)
 The Capture (1950) - Valdez
 The Lawless (1950) - Mr. Rodriguez
 Bright Leaf (1950) - Accountant at Tobacco auction (uncredited)
 Crisis (1950) - Man with Valise / Voice on Loudspeaker (uncredited)
 A Lady Without Passport (1950) - Slinky Man (uncredited)
 Wyoming Mail (1950) - Pete
 Branded (1950) - (uncredited)
 The Bandit Queen (1950) - Ortiz (uncredited)
 Short Grass (1950) - Manuel
 Sirocco (1951) - Soldier (uncredited)
 The Mark of the Renegade (1951) - Servant (uncredited)
 Havana Rose (1951) - General Cucarotsky (uncredited)
 My Favorite Spy (1951) - Porter (uncredited)
 The Fighter (1952) - Pedro Dimas (uncredited)
 Rancho Notorious (1952) - Sanchez (uncredited)
 The Hitch-Hiker (1953) - Bit Part (uncredited)
 Jeopardy (1953) - Mexican Border Official (uncredited)
 Wings of the Hawk (1953) - Guard (uncredited)
 Tumbleweed (1953) - Mexican (uncredited)
 Border River (1954) - Pablo
 Jubilee Trail (1954) - Pedro (uncredited)
 Dawn at Socorro (1954) - Casino Waiter (uncredited)
 Three Hours to Kill (1954) - Esteban
 Strange Lady in Town (1955) - Esteban (uncredited)
 The Broken Star (1956) - Carlos Alvarado (uncredited)
 Back from Eternity (1956) - Shrunken Head Peddler
 Giant (1956) - Gómez (uncredited)
 The Iron Sheriff (1957) - Courtroom Spectator (uncredited)
 The Persuader (1957) - Pete
 Tip on a Dead Jockey (1957) - Doctor (uncredited)
 Teenage Doll (1957) - Squirrel's Father (uncredited)
 Gun Battle at Monterey (1957) - Martinez  (uncredited)
 Holiday for Lovers (1959) - Cafe Patron (uncredited)
 The Miracle (1959) - Proprietor (uncredited)
 One-Eyed Jacks (1961) - Cardsharp (uncredited)
 The Second Time Around (1961) - The Cantina Bartender (uncredited)
 The Chase (1966) - Worker (uncredited)
 Jesse James Meets Frankenstein's Daughter (1966) - Manuel López
 Firecreek (1968) - Carlos (uncredited)
 I Love You, Alice B. Toklas (1968) - Rodríguez Family Member (uncredited)
 Hook, Line & Sinker (1969) - Foreign Mortician
 Fuzz (1972) - Puerto Rican Prisoner
 The All-American Boy (1973) - Elderly Trainer (uncredited)
 Walk Proud (1979) - Prayer Maker

Television

 Rebound (1952) - Sebastian
 Boston Blackie (1953)
 Stories of the Century (1955) - Méndez
 The Star and the Story (1955) - Gypsy
 Cavalcade of America (1956)
 Broken Arrow (1956)
 Cheyenne (1957) - Ortiz
 The Lineup (1957) - Gonzales
 Death Valley Days (1957) - Leiva
 26 Men (1958) - Greco
 The Restless Gun (1958) - Tío Paco
 Playhouse 90 (1957-1959) 
 Black Saddle (1959) - El Mudo
 General Electric Theater (1959)
 Wagon Train (1959) - Mr. Canellis
 Peter Gunn (1959) - Inspector Guevera
 Tales of Wells Fargo (1957-1959) - Barkeep
 The Man and the Challenge (1960) - Grantina
 Checkmate (1960) - Policeman
 Bonanza (1961) - Jail Guard
 Target: The Corruptors! (1962) 
 Temple Houston (1965)
 Convoy (1965) - Waiter
 Rawhide (1965) - Barber
 I Spy (1966) - Jorge
 The Immortal (1970) - Juan
 The High Chaparral (1970) - Stableman
 Search (1972) - Krishna Singh
 Adam-12 (1973) - Antonio
 Kung Fu (1973) - Tadeo
 The Cowboys (1974) - Adolfo
 Cannon (1975) - Dr. Xomiti
 Police Story (1975) - Mr. Segura
 The Quest (1976) - Peasant
 Barney Miller (1978) - Jorge Rodríguez
 How the West Was Won (1978) - Manuel's Grandfather
 Lou Grant (1977-1979) - Old Man / Grandfather
 Matt Houston (1983) - Santos

References

External links
 
 

1898 births
1992 deaths
Mexican emigrants to the United States
Mexican actors
American male film actors
American male television actors
Deaths from pneumonia in California
Burials at San Fernando Mission Cemetery
Mexican people of Croatian descent
20th-century American male actors